The Thirrë-Kalimash Tunnel is a highway tunnel in Thirrë, Albania under the A1 Albania–Kosovo Highway. It is part of the South-East European Route 7. The tunnel is of great importance and together with the highway have reduced the travel duration between Tirana and Kosovo border from 8 hours to 3 hours, with an estimated speed of 80–110 km/h.  It also boosted tourism in Albania and deepened the cultural and economic exchanges between Albania and Kosovo.

The structure is 5490 m long, making it the longest tunnel in Albania.

In 2018, toll booths are being installed on the eastern extremity of the tunnel near Kolsh, as part of making A1 the first toll highway in Albania.

References 

Road tunnels in Albania
Tunnels in Albania